Nick Lutsko is an American singer, songwriter, comedian, and multi-instrumentalist best known for his comedic songs and videos released via social media, particularly Twitter and YouTube. Most of the videos feature Lutsko portraying a fictional version of himself, singing directly into the camera about political figures, current events, or pop culture, often with absurdist or surreal tones. He also does commercial composition work, winning a 2022 Webby Award for Best Original Music for his work with Lord Danger for Old Spice. He has also written songs for Netflix, CollegeHumor, and Super Deluxe.

A long-time resident of Chattanooga, Tennessee and a graduate of Middle Tennessee State University, Lutsko films most of his music videos in and around his Chattanooga home. Lutsko has released several albums, including Swords (2019), a non-comedy album Lutsko worked on for four years. Several of his comedic Internet songs have been compiled into the albums Songs on the Computer (2020) and More Songs on the Computer (2021). Lutsko's videos have garnered millions of views online.

Lutsko has created songs parodying political figures and topics like Donald Trump, Joe Biden, Alex Jones, Donald Trump Jr., Fox News, and Pizzagate. Lutsko often appears sweaty and crazed in his videos, and his songs feature several running jokes and recurring characters, creating what Nerdist writer Michael Walsh called the "Nick Lutsko Expanded Universe". Among these jokes are Lutsko's adoration of conservative commentator Dan Bongino, his ongoing feud with Amazon CEO Jeff Bezos, and his relationship with his grandmother, who lives in a house with a basement Lutsko claims is inhabited by "men in the tunnels".

Lutsko's character repeatedly writes unsolicited theme songs, including for Space Jam: A New Legacy, The Irishman, and the Spirit Halloween retail store chain. The lattermost song inspired Spirit Halloween to solicit two additional songs from Lutsko about the company, which also led to recurring jokes about Lutsko being the "King of Halloween". Lutsko also regularly sings about the Gremlins film franchise, sometimes portraying a human/gremlin hybrid character named Desmond, and attempting to produce a fictional sequel film called Gremlins 3: Dawn of Desmond.

Lutsko has long performed with his bandmate and bassist Eric "Greezy Rick" Parham, who performs while wearing a Muppet-like mask with brown fur and an elongated nose. He also regularly performs with "Cowboy Jon" Elliot, who plays saxophone and xylophone while wearing cowboy attire.

Discography

Studio albums 

 Heart of Mold (2013)
 Etc. (2015)
 Swords (2019)
 Songs on the Computer (2020)
 More Songs on the Computer (2021)

Extended plays 

 Mumbo Jumbo Trash (2012)
 America's Boy (2021)
 One Man Show (2021)
 Halloween Planet (2021)
 Hell Yup! (2022)
 Incantations (2022)

Singles 

 Grinning Like a Barracuda (2018)
 Spineless (2020)

References

21st-century American male actors
21st-century American singers
American comedy musicians
American male singer-songwriters
American parodists
American satirists
Living people
Nerd culture
Parody musicians
Singer-songwriters from Tennessee
People from Chattanooga, Tennessee
Middle Tennessee State University alumni
1990 births